Shurjestan (also Romanized as Shūrjestān; also known as Shūlgistan, Shūljestān, and Shūlqestān) is a village in Bahman Rural District, in the Central District of Abadeh County, Fars Province, Iran. At the 2006 census, its population was 618, in 187 families.

References 

Populated places in Abadeh County